Qaysa (also, Kaysa and Koysa) is a village and municipality in the Balakan Rayon of Azerbaijan.  It has a population of 3,595.  The municipality consists of the villages of Qaysa and Abjit.

References 

Populated places in Balakan District